Mark Duffner (born July 19, 1953) is an American football coach who is the senior defensive assistant for the Cincinnati Bengals of the National Football League (NFL). Duffner served as the head coach of the Maryland Terrapins football team from 1992 to 1996.

Duffner was born and raised in the Washington, D.C. suburb of Annandale, Virginia; he played tackle for legendary coach Bob Hardage at powerhouse Annandale High School and played collegiately at the College of William and Mary under head coach Marv Levy and was recruited to the school by assistant coach Bobby Ross. His first coaching job was as a Graduate Assistant under iconic coach Woody Hayes at Ohio State University followed by a stint as Defensive Coordinator for the University of Cincinnati Bearcats; he moved to Holy Cross in the same role in 1981 and ascended to the Head Coach position in 1986, compiling a stellar 60–5–1 record. At Maryland, Duffner compiled a 20–35 record, his most important legacy at Maryland has been in the record books; most of the Terps' longstanding single game, season, and career passing and receiving record were broken during his tenure. This was due to the implementation of his run and shoot offense and quarterbacks John Kaleo, Scott Milanovich, and Brian Cummings. However, his teams were notoriously weak on defense, frequently giving up points so fast that even his prolific offense couldn't keep up. Duffner's only winning season came in 1995 when the Terps finished with a 6–5 record and started with four consecutive wins.

After leaving Maryland, Duffner became an assistant with the Cincinnati Bengals from 1997 to 2002, where he served as linebackers coach and then defensive coordinator. From 2003 to 2005, he served with the Green Bay Packers. In early 2006, he was signed by the Jacksonville Jaguars as the linebackers coach. He was hired by the Miami Dolphins in January to be their LB Coach for the 2014 season. On October 15, 2018 Duffner was named as the new defensive coordinator of the Tampa Bay Buccaneers.

Duffner was hired by the Bengals as a senior defensive assistant on March 7, 2019. He missed the team's week 10 game in 2020 against the Pittsburgh Steelers due to COVID-19 pandemic protocols.

Head coaching record

References

External links
 Cincinnati Bengals profile

1953 births
Living people
American football defensive linemen
Cincinnati Bearcats football coaches
Cincinnati Bengals coaches
Green Bay Packers coaches
Holy Cross Crusaders football coaches
Jacksonville Jaguars coaches
Maryland Terrapins football coaches
Miami Dolphins coaches
National Football League defensive coordinators
Ohio State Buckeyes football coaches
Tampa Bay Buccaneers coaches
William & Mary Tribe football players
Sportspeople from Fairfax County, Virginia
Coaches of American football from Virginia
Players of American football from Virginia